Magnext is a magnetic construction toy consisting of plastic building pieces containing embedded neodymium magnets, steel bearing balls, and a variety of additional parts which can be connected together to form anything from skeletal geometric shapes and structures to more robust and functional toys. 

Magnext is modeled after the original Geomag magnetic construction set, and features an expanded offering of accessories marketed specifically toward older children. Magnext is sold by MEGA Brands as the successor to the discontinued Magnetix series, and retains backward compatibility with the parts.

Rather than the rods of Geomag, Magnext has 'triangular' and 'square' pieces with 3 and 4 embedded magnets. The balls are 0.59 inches in diameter (larger than the 0.50 inch balls of Geomag).

Being one of mega's last attempts at the magnetic toy business the company made small figures in some sets out of a strong and lightly stretchy rubber.

References

Magnext Official Product Page

External links
MagNext instructions

Construction toys